Lycée Français Théodore Monod (LfTM or LTM) is a French curriculum international school in Abu Dhabi. It is one of five schools operated by the Association Franco-Libanaise pour l’Éducation et la Culture (AFLEC).

It opened in 2003.

, 29.8% of the students were French, 3% were Emiratis, and 67.2% were of other nationalities.

It serves grade levels Toute petite section (less than 3 years) to terminales (in the lycée or middle school/senior high school level).

References

External links

 Lycée Français Théodore Monod
 Lycée Français Théodore Monod 
 Lycée Français Théodore Monod 
 Lycée Français Théodore Monod  (Archive)
 Previous website at Canalblog 

2003 establishments in the United Arab Emirates
Educational institutions established in 2003
International schools in Abu Dhabi
Private schools in the United Arab Emirates
French international schools in the United Arab Emirates